

John B. Heywood was a photographer in 19th-century United States. He worked in Boston, Massachusetts, c. 1856-1861. Examples of his photographs reside in the New York Public Library and the Massachusetts Historical Society.

References

External links

 Flickr. Hand-colored daguerreotype of Nathaniel Holmes Bishop at age 23, credited to Heywood & Heard of Boston, 1860.

Image gallery

Year of birth missing
Year of death missing
Photographers from Massachusetts
Artists from Boston
19th century in Boston
19th-century American photographers